Ward brothers may refer to:

Ward brothers (carvers), American carvers
Ward brothers (rowers), four American rowers who were brothers
The Ward Brothers, a British band
Ward Brothers' House and Shop, a historic home located in Maryland, U.S.
The Ward brothers, four brothers who were accused of murder and later featured in the documentary film Brother's Keeper